Gustave Doyen (1836 in Festieux – 1923 in Fontainebleau) was a French painter working during 19th and 20th centuries in France. He was educated at St Edmund's College in Douai and trained by William Bouguereau. He exhibited his paintings in the Salon de Paris.

Paintings
The stopped reading
Jealousy
The walk
Contemplation
Young girl carrying a pitcher
Joan of Arc
The bather
Little girl with her doll

Gallery

Bibliography
 E. Bénézit, Dictionnaire critique et documentaire des peintres, sculpteurs, dessinateurs et graveurs, t. 3, Gründ, Évreux 1976.

19th-century French painters
French male painters
20th-century French painters
20th-century French male artists
1836 births
1923 deaths
19th-century French male artists